John S. Burgess (May 10, 1920 – September 20, 2007) was an American attorney and politician from Vermont who served as Speaker of the Vermont House of Representatives (1969–1971) and the 72nd lieutenant governor of Vermont (1971–1975).

Biography
John Stuart "Jack" Burgess was born in New York City on May 10, 1920.  He was a bomber navigator in the U.S. Army Air Forces during World War II, served on active duty again during the Korean War, and attained the rank of Major in the Air Force Reserve.

Burgess received an LL.B. from Northeastern University in 1949, graduated from the University of Vermont with a BA in 1950, and became a lawyer in Brattleboro.  He served as Windham County State's Attorney from 1952 to 1957.  He also served in numerous local government positions in Brattleboro, including Town Agent, Town Attorney, and Justice of the Peace.

A Republican, he was an unsuccessful candidate for the nomination for Vermont Attorney General in 1962, losing to Charles E. Gibson Jr.  He was elected to the Vermont House of Representatives in 1964, and reelected in 1966 and 1968; he was Chairman of the Judiciary Committee before serving as Speaker.

In 1970 Burgess was the successful Republican nominee for Lieutenant Governor and served two terms, 1971 to 1975.  He lost the 1974 Republican primary for Vermont's seat in the U.S. House of Representatives to Jim Jeffords.

After leaving office Burgess continued to practice law and maintained his participation in Brattleboro's local government and civic activities.  He died in Keene, New Hampshire on September 20, 2007, and was buried in Brattleboro's Meeting House Hill Cemetery.

References

External links
Oral History: Jack Burgess, WWII Vet, sponsored by Brattleboro Rotary Club, accessed December 25, 2011

1920 births
2007 deaths
People from Brattleboro, Vermont
Lieutenant Governors of Vermont
Speakers of the Vermont House of Representatives
Republican Party members of the Vermont House of Representatives
Vermont lawyers
State's attorneys in Vermont
University of Vermont alumni
Northeastern University School of Law alumni
United States Air Force reservists
Lawyers from New York City
Politicians from New York City
Military personnel from New York City
United States Army Air Forces officers
United States Army Air Forces personnel of World War II
20th-century American politicians
Burials in Vermont
United States Air Force personnel of the Korean War
20th-century American lawyers
United States Air Force officers